Launaea picridioides is a species of flowering plants of the family Asteraceae. The species is endemic to Cape Verde. It is listed as a vulnerable species by the IUCN.

Distribution
The species is found in the northwest of Cape Verde, in the islands of Santo Antão, São Vicente and São Nicolau. The plant is found between 200 and 900 m elevation.

References

Further reading

picridioides
Endemic flora of Cape Verde
Flora of Santo Antão, Cape Verde
Flora of São Nicolau, Cape Verde
Flora of São Vicente, Cape Verde